Death Before Dishonor is a professional wrestling event, held annually by the Ring of Honor promotion. The event was initially held in 2003, and is traditionally one of ROH's biggest signature events in the calendar year. The 2010 edition of the show was ROH's third internet pay-per-view, and the third ROH show to be broadcast live. The 2011 and 2012 editions were also broadcast as internet pay-per-views. The 2020 event was scheduled for an unspecified date but was ultimately cancelled due to the COVID-19 pandemic.

Dates and venues

See also 
ROH's annual events

References

External links 
 Ring of Honor's official site